Dustin Brown and Horacio Zeballos were the defending champions but Zeballos decided not to participate.
Brown played alongside Lukáš Dlouhý, losing in the first round.
Andre Begemann and Martin Emmrich won the title, defeating Dominik Meffert and Philipp Oswald 6–3, 6–1 in the final.

Seeds

Draw

Draw

References
 Main Draw

AON Open Challenger - Doubles
2012 Doubles
AON